Ekoko is a surname. Notable people with the surname include:

Ben Duala Ekoko (1949–2009), Cameroonian Attorney General of the Southwest Region of Cameroon 
Jirès Kembo Ekoko (born 1988), French Congolese footballer 

Surnames of African origin